The Boeing CC-137 was a transport and tanker aircraft which served with the Canadian Forces from 1970 to 1997. The Boeing 707-347C aircraft provided long range passenger transport for the military, VIP transport for government and air-to-air refueling for fighters such as the CF-116 Freedom Fighter and CF-18 Hornet. It was replaced by the Airbus CC-150 Polaris in the transport role and much later in the tanker role.

Design and development
During the 1960s, the Royal Canadian Air Force set out a requirement to replace the aging fleet of Canadair CC-106 Yukons and Canadair CC-109 Cosmopolitan transports. Initially, the Boeing KC-135 was being considered because the versatile design could also fulfill a yet-unspecified aerial refuelling role. Although a "purpose-built" aircraft would have suited the RCAF requirements better, an opportunity to acquire Boeing 707s as an alternative, soon presented itself.

Operational history

Canada purchased five Boeing 707s in 1970–71 to replace the RCAF's  CC-106 Yukons in the long range transport role and the CC-109 Cosmopolitan as an executive or short-range transport.  The first four aircraft had been built for Western Airlines, but that order was subsequently cancelled; the fifth was bought separately a year later. To fulfil Canada's requirements for aerial refueling, two aircraft were fitted with Beechcraft made probe and drogue refueling pods in 1972. The two sets of refuelling equipment were moved from aircraft to aircraft to keep fleet utilization even between the airframes.

The CC-137 fleet had a combined total of 191,154 hours, remaining in service in the transport role until 1995, with two aircraft continuing in use as tankers until 1997.

Most of the fleet ended up with the Northrop Grumman E-8 Joint STARS programme either for spare parts or conversion to E-8C standard for the United States Air Force.

Operators

Canadian Forces Air Command
No. 437 "Husky" Squadron RCAF based at CFB Trenton, Ontario

Specifications (CC-137)

See also

References

Notes

Bibliography

 Bowers, Peter M. Boeing Aircraft since 1916. London: Putnam, 1989. .
 Stachiw, Anthony L. Boeing CC137 (707-347C). St. Catharine's, Ontario, Canada: Vanwell Publishing Ltd., 2004. .

External links

 Canadian Forces Historical Aircraft – Boeing 707 (CC-137)
 Boeing CC-137 B707-320 at rcaf.com

CC-137
1970s United States military transport aircraft
Quadjets
Low-wing aircraft
Aircraft first flown in 1970